Qarar is a 2020 Pakistani drama television series premiered on Hum TV on 8 November 2020. Written by Aliya Bukhari, it has Sanam Jung, Mikaal Zulfiqar, Muneeb Butt and Rabab Hashim in lead roles.

Cast 
 Sanam Jung as Maya
 Rabab Hashim as Fariha
 Muneeb Butt as Ammar
 Mikaal Zulfiqar as Junaid
 Seemi Pasha as Nadra
 Waseem Abbas as Siraj
 Sangeeta as Naani
 Ali Safina as Salman
 Rimsha Khan as Zaib Un Nisa
 Umair
 Shahzad Nawaz (minor appearance)

Soundtrack 

The official soundtrack of the serial Tu Qarar Hai... has been composed by Waqar Ali while lyrics were written by Sabir Zafar. The OST was performed by Rahat Fateh Ali Khan.

References

Pakistani drama television series
Urdu-language television shows
2020 Pakistani television series debuts